Morgan Nicole Reid Allen (born Morgan Nicole Reid; June 13, 1995) is an American former soccer player who played as a defender. She played collegiately at Duke University before being drafted by the North Carolina Courage in the fourth round of the 2018 NWSL College Draft.

Early life 
Reid was born in Cleveland, Ohio. She grew up in Cary, North Carolina and attended the private Cardinal Gibbons High School in Raleigh, North Carolina, playing both soccer and basketball. She was a four-year letter winner and a two-time team MVP ad the basketball team's starting point guard. In 2011 as a sophomore, Reid was invited to attend the U.S. National Soccer Camp in California, gaining a shot at the U.S. Soccer Youth National Team.

In soccer, she guided her team to the 2013 State Championship, scoring against St. Stephens High School in the final. She was named NCSCA Player of the Year and Gatorade Player of the Year for the state of North Carolina in 2014, ranking as the No. 1 player in the South Atlantic Region.

Duke Blue Devils (2014–17) 
Reid attended Duke University from 2014 to 2017 where she got a degree in evolutionary anthropology and was a four-time member of the ACC Honor Roll. She was a four-year starter for the Duke Blue Devils, making a total of 92 appearances. In her senior year she helped the team secure a school-record 18 shutouts before earning another in the 2017 College Cup semi-final against UCLA. However, Duke was eliminated on penalties. Reid had previously made it to a College Cup final in 2015, eventually losing 1–0 to Penn State.

Club career

North Carolina Courage (2018) 
In January 2018, Reid was drafted in the fourth round (38th overall) of the 2018 NWSL College Draft. She failed to make an NWSL appearance for the Courage but did make substitute appearances in two friendlies against French Division 1 teams Paris Saint-Germain and Olympique Lyon as part of the 2018 Women's International Champions Cup. The Courage won the tournament.

Orlando Pride (2019–20) 
On April 4, 2019, Reid was traded to the Orlando Pride in exchange for a 2020 NWSL College Draft fourth round pick. She made her competitive professional debut on May 11, 2019, starting against Portland Thorns FC. She was waived at the end of the 2020 season having missed the year through injury and made available on the re-entry wire but was not picked up.

Retirement 
In November 2022, Reid revealed she retired due to severe hip pain. Having been misdiagnosed on five separate occasions, she was finally diagnosed with a labral tear that required surgery after seeing a specialist at the American Hip Institute in Chicago.

International career 
Reid was a member of the United States under-17 squad that won the 2012 CONCACAF Women's under-17 Championship. Later that year she was part of the team that traveled to Azerbaijan for the 2012 FIFA under-17 Women's World Cup. They failed to progress from the group stage on goal difference, the first time a team had been eliminated without losing. In 2014, she was called into under-20 camp by Michelle French.

Personal life 
Reid grew up in a sports oriented family. Her parents met at Ohio State University in the late 80s, her father Brian was on the wrestling team and her mother Cheryl played basketball. Her grandfather, George Reid, also wrestled and is a celebrated coach, notably as head coach at the University of Georgia. In 2010 he was inducted into the National Wrestling Hall of Fame. Her three brothers Justin, Jake and Jason all play basketball, while her younger sister Madison is a soccer player having been part of the North Carolina Courage Development Academy before committing to Clemson in 2020.

Reid began dating Duke men's basketball player Grayson Allen while both were attending Duke. They got engaged in February 2022 and married on July 23, 2022.

Honors

College 
Duke Blue Devils
Atlantic Coast Conference Regular Season: 2017
Women's College Cup runner-up: 2015

Club 
North Carolina Courage
 NWSL Champions: 2018
 NWSL Shield: 2018
 Women's International Champions Cup: 2018

International 
 CONCACAF Women's under-17 Championship: 2012

References

External links 
 
 Duke player profile
 US Soccer player profile

National Women's Soccer League players
1995 births
Living people
Orlando Pride players
People from Cary, North Carolina
Duke Blue Devils women's soccer players
Soccer players from North Carolina
North Carolina Courage draft picks
American women's soccer players
Women's association football defenders